The Minnesota Duluth Bulldogs represented the University of Minnesota Duluth in WCHA women's ice hockey. The Bulldogs will attempt to win the NCAA tournament for the sixth time in school history.

Offseason

Recruiting

Regular season

Schedule

Conference record

Roster

Awards and honors
Kayla Black, WCHA Defensive Player of the Week (Week of October 18, 2012)

References

Minnesota Duluth Bulldogs women's ice hockey seasons
2012–13 NCAA Division I women's hockey season